Epicephala zalosticha is a moth of the family Gracillariidae. It is known from Queensland and New South Wales, Australia.

References

Epicephala
Moths described in 1940